The 1991 FIVB Women's U20 World Championship was held in Brno, Czechoslovakia from July 26 to August 4, 1991. 16 teams participated in the tournament.

Qualification process 

 * Poland replaced Turkey.

Pools composition

Preliminary round

Pool A 

|}

Pool B 

|}

Pool C 

|}

Pool D 

|}

Second round

Play off – elimination group

Play off – seeding group

Final round

Quarterfinals

5th–8th semifinals

Semifinals

7th place

5th place

3rd place

Final

Final standing

External links 
 Informative website.

World Championship
FIVB Volleyball Women's U20 World Championship
FIVB Women's Junior World Championship
1991 in youth sport